Finisterrae was the 100th supercomputer in Top500 ranking in November 2007. Running at 12.97 teraFLOPS, it would rank at position 258 on the list as of June 2008. It is also the third most powerful supercomputer in Spain (after MareNostrum and Magerit). It is located in Galicia.

This project is promoted by the Xunta de Galicia (regional government of Galicia) and the Spanish National Research Council (CSIC). It was founded in 1993 to serve as a platform to foster scientific innovation and invest in Research and Development.

It is estimated that the base project will be completed in 2010. It is expected to reach the TOP10 of the most powerful supercomputers in the world when it reaches full capacity. The supercomputer is physically hosted at CESGA.

Overview 
The main Finisterrae characteristics are depicted on the following table:

One of the special characteristics about FinisTerrae I supercomputer is the ratio between cores and RAM. This was one reason that it received the denomination of "singular technical and scientific installation" from the Spanish government, a denomination given to some installations which have some value that makes them singular in some way. Some of those installations include the Canary Island grand telescope, or the Alba synchrotron.

Even if this is the third fastest supercomputer in Spain, some projects that require special amounts of memory cannot be held by the first or second supercomputer, and therefore must be executed on the Finisterrae.

Architecture

FinisTerrae I 

FinisTerrae supercomputer, located in CESGA is an integrated system by shared-memory nodes with and SMP NUMA architecture.

FinisTerrae is composed of 144 computational nodes:

  HP Integrity rx7640 nodes with 16 Itanium Montvale cores and 128 GB memory each one
  Integrity Superdome node, with 128 Itanium Montvale cores and 1024 GB memory
  Integrity Superdome node, with 128 Itanium 2 cores and 384 GB memory

A hierarchic storing system with:

 22 nodes for storing management with 96 processing cores
The storage is connected to 72 cabins connected to 864 SATA disks, managed  by Lustre. Backups are stored on tapes which provide 2.200.000 GB.
An interconnecting network between Infiniband 4x DDR at 20 Gbit/s nodes, providing 16 Gbit/s of effective bandwidth
 An external management Gigabit Ethernet network
 The nodes user SUSE Linux Enterprise Server as the operating system. This operating system helped save an important amount of money when compared to other non-free options.
 FinisTerrae includes open software and standard like Linux, Lustre, Grid Engine and Globus.
System also has next compilators, libraries and development tools: Intel C/C and Fortran, Intel MKL, Vtune, HP-MPI and HP UPC.

Curiosities 
 The machines need  of space.
 Its weight is around 33,5 tons.

FinisTerrae II

FinisTerrae III

Projects 
As main purpose, the aim of the supercomputer is research. The supercomputer is mainly used by the three universities located in Galicia, (Universidade da Coruña, Universidade de Santiago de Compostela and Universidade de Vigo), as well as other research organizations like CSIC. The main projects held by the supercomputer are divided into four fields:
 Life sciences
 Nanotechnology
 Sea sciences
 Renewable energies

External links 
CESGA
Details and rank at Top500 list
Finisterrae inauguration 

Cluster computing
Supercomputers
Science and technology in Galicia (Spain)
Spanish Supercomputing Network